Joël Lightbound  (born February 8, 1988) is a Canadian politician serving as the member of Parliament (MP) for Louis-Hébert. A member of the Liberal Party, he was first elected following the 2015 federal election.

Background 
In 2008, Lightbound was awarded the Cardinal Roy Trophy from Champlain Regional College. He later attended the McGill University Faculty of Law, where he won the National Laskin Moot. He initially articled with the Montreal offices of Fasken, and prior to his election practiced law in the Quebec City area, specializing in immigration.

Political career 
Lightbound was elected in 2015. He was re-elected in 2019, becoming the first MP in three decades to hold Louis-Hébert for more than one term, and again in 2021.

In February 2022, during the COVID-19 pandemic and Freedom Convoy protests, Lightbound held a press conference where he spoke out against politicians' handling of the pandemic, and denounced dismissing those with "legitimate concerns" while also calling for the convoy protesters to return home. Soon afterwards, Lightbound resigned his position in the ruling party as Quebec caucus chair.

Electoral record

References

External links 

 

1988 births
Franco-Ontarian people
Immigration lawyers
Lawyers in Quebec
Liberal Party of Canada MPs
Living people
Members of the House of Commons of Canada from Quebec
New York (state) lawyers
Politicians from Quebec City
Politicians from Toronto
McGill University Faculty of Law alumni
21st-century Canadian politicians